Centennial High School is a public high school located in Franklin, Tennessee, United States. The school serves the central section of Williamson County for students in grades 9–12.

The school is accredited by the Southern Association of Colleges and Schools.

History 
The school opened in 1996 to relieve overcrowding at nearby Franklin High School.

In 2014, a new 500-seat performing arts center was constructed. The new auditorium includes dressing rooms and set storage space and was built as part of a multi-phase project that called for building auditoriums at all Williamson County middle and high schools.

Academics and testing 
In 2016, Centennial had its highest graduation rate to date: 95 percent. The average ACT score was a 21.9, with 83 percent of the graduates planning on attending a four-year college. The school offers 23 Advanced Placement courses. In 2016, 491 students took a combined 906 AP exams.

Arts

Band/Orchestra 
The Centennial band program comprises a fall marching band, winter color guard and percussion units, concert ensembles, and a jazz band. Centennial also offers orchestra and guitar classes during the school day.

Choir 
The Centennial Chamber Choir has performed with the Nashville Symphony, Foreigner, and at Walt Disney World. In fall 2016, the vocal music department produced and released a Christmas album. The cds were sold for $10 each as a fundraiser.

Theatre 
The Centennial Theatre program operates under the name Center Stage Productions. Each year, the crew produces a fall play and a spring musical. The theatre program also sponsors a chapter of the International Thespian Society, an honor society for theatre students.

Special programs

WIT Center 
Williamson's Information Technology Center of Excellence at Centennial High School launched in fall 2014. The center is part of a collaboration between Williamson County Schools and Columbia State Community College.

The center includes classes in networking, computer programming, web development, application design for both computers and mobile devices, and robotics. Students enrolled in these classes earn college credit for the courses in addition to credits toward high school graduation.

Cosmetology Center 
Centennial is the only Williamson County high school that offers a cosmetology program. Students earn class credit that can be transferred to several cosmetology schools in the southeast. Additionally, students can accrue state board hours for post-secondary credit.

Athletics

TSSAA-sanctioned sports 
Centennial offers the following TSSAA-sanctioned teams. No teams have won a state championship, but the boys' soccer team has won a single state runner-up title and the 2015 football team won the school’s first ever region championship.
 Baseball
 Boys' basketball
 Girls' basketball
 Bowling
 Boys' cross country
 Girls' cross country
 Football: 2015 and 2016 Region Champions
 Boys' golf
 Girls' golf
 Boys' soccer: 2010 state champion runner-up
 Girls' soccer
 Softball
 Boys' tennis
 Girls' tennis
 Boys' track
 Girls' track
 Volleyball
 Wrestling

Club Sports 
In addition to TSSAA sports, the school also has numerous club sports. Years in bold indicate state championships. Years in italics indicate state runners-up.
 Clay target
 Cheerleading
 Varsity: 2001, 2002, 2003, 2004, 2008, 2009, 2010, 2011, 2012, 2014, 2015, 2016
 Junior Varsity: 2002, 2009, 2011, 2012, 2013, 2016
 Dance
 Hockey: 2001, 2014
 Boys' lacrosse: 2002 (co-op team with Franklin)
 Girls' lacrosse
 Swimming
Centennial previously fielded a rugby team, but that team is currently inactive. These sports have a combined 13 state championships.

Notable alumni 
 Russell Dickerson, singer-songwriter (class of 2005)
 Curtis Steele, professional football player  for the Baltimore Ravens (class of 2005)
 Kelsea Ballerini, singer-songwriter (class of 2011)
 Tony Kemp, professional baseball player for the Oakland Athletics (class of 2010)
 Tyrel Dodson, professional football linebacker for the Buffalo Bills (class of 2016)

References

External links 
 Centennial High School official website

Public high schools in Tennessee
Schools in Williamson County, Tennessee
Buildings and structures in Franklin, Tennessee
1996 establishments in Tennessee
Educational institutions established in 1996